"What If I'm Right" is a song written by Tom Gilbert and Sandi Thom that was recorded for Thom's debut album, Smile... It Confuses People (2006). The song was released in the UK on 28 August 2006 as a digital download. According to Thom's official website, the song  "explores the bittersweetness of a newfound relationship, where the excitement of what there is to gain is eclipsed by the fear of what there could be to lose". Upon its release, "What If I'm Right" reached the top 40 in Australia, Ireland, New Zealand, and the United Kingdom, where it peaked at number 22 on the UK Singles Chart.

Track listings
UK CD1
 "What If I'm Right" (radio mix) – 2:56
 "Cinderella in Reverse" – 2:38

UK CD2
 "What If I'm Right" (radio mix) – 2:56
 "What If I'm Right" (acoustic) – 3:23
 "Don't Think Twice" – 2:24
 "What If I'm Right" (video) – 2:57

Digital download EP
 "What If I'm Right" – 2:58
 "Cinderella in Reverse" – 2:37
 "Don't Think Twice" – 2:23
 "What If I'm Right" (acoustic) – 3:24

Charts

Release history

References

2006 singles
RCA Records singles
Sandi Thom songs